Texas Plates is the second album by the singer-songwriter Vince Bell. It was released on April 13, 1999, and found Bell comfortably ensconced in the upper echelon of the songwriting guild and signed to a major record label. Unfortunately, whatever marketing there was presented him as just another singer-songwriter, as if they were all cut from the same Texan cloth, and the album remains largely unheard.

Track listing
"Poetry, Texas"
"All Through My Days"
"Push Comes to Shove"
"2nd Street"
"All The Way to the Moon"
"Place to Call Our Own"
"Best Is Yet to Come"
"Have Not, Will Travel"
"100 Miles from Mexico"
"The Fair"
"Last Dance at the Last Chance"

Song credits
"All The Way to the Moon," "Best Is Yet to Come," "Have Not, Will Travel," "100 Miles from Mexico," "Place to Call Our Own," "Poetry, Texas": Vince Bell, TVB Publishing (BMI), administered by Bug Music
"The Fair," "Push Comes to Shove," "2nd Street": Vince Bell, Bug Music (BMI)/TVB Publishing (BMI), administered by Bug Music
"All Through My Days": Vince Bell and Connie Mims, Bug Music (BMI)/Black Coffee Music (BMI), administered by Bug Music
"Last Dance at the Last Chance": Vince Bell, Bug Music (BMI)/Black Coffee Music (BMI), administered by Bug Music

Album cover
The photograph on the front cover of the album is of Bell's great grandparents, Emily Louise and William Strickland, circa 1940s. According to the liner notes: "They sold gas and feed, flour and cold drinks, and anything else anyone needed from their general store on Highway 67, outside of Red Water, Texas."

Personnel
Vince Bell – vocal, harmonies, guitar
Pat Bergeson – harmonicas
Lewis Brown – trombone
Pat Buchanon – guitars, sitar
Chris Carmichael – strings
Robin Eaton – bass, baritone guitar, acoustic guitar, sitar, jaw harp
Mickey Grimm – drums, percussion, cajón
Dave Jacques – electric and acoustic bass
Brad Jones – upright bass
Al Perkins – banjo, steel, dobro, lap, pedal steel, Kona guitar
Ross Rice – piano, bass, Moog, Vox organ, harmonium, Wurlitzer, Melodica, organ, vibes and Omnichord
Elijah Shaw – E-Bow
Aly Sujo – violin
Fireworks - Tennessee State Fair
Kami Lyle - guest vocalist
Maura O'Connell - guest vocalist
Alex Eaton - guest vocalist

Production
Producer: Robin Eaton
Engineer and Mixer: Elijah Shaw

Recorded and mixed at Alex The Great Recording, Nashville, Tennessee

Mastered by James DeMain, Nashville, TN

Reviews
 CD Shakedown review by Randy Krbechek, July 23, 1999
 [ Allmusic review by Bill Ashford]

External links 
 Vince Bell official site
  Vince Bell's MySpace page
 Daryn Kagan profiles Vince Bell
 Vince Bell's artist bio at the H.A.A.M. (Houston Association of Acoustic Musicians) website
 “Introducing the Vince Bell "Handmade Hardtop Acoustic Dreadnaught Line”: lutier Vince Pawless describes custom-making a guitar for Vince Bell

1999 albums
Vince Bell albums